KPOA (93.5 FM) is a radio station broadcasting a Hawaiian Adult Contemporary format. Licensed to Lahaina, Hawaii, United States, the station is owned by Pacific Radio Group, Inc.

References

External links

Hawaiian-music formatted radio stations
POA
Lahaina, Hawaii
Mainstream adult contemporary radio stations in the United States